Union, Work, Progress was an electoral list in Gabon.

History
Headed by former Gabonese Democratic and Social Union member Jean-Stanislas Migolet, the list ran in the Ogooué-Lolo Province in the 1957 Territorial Assembly elections. It won all four seats in the province.

References

Defunct political parties in Gabon